Witobel  is a village in the administrative district of Gmina Stęszew, within Poznań County, Greater Poland Voivodeship, in west-central Poland.

The village has a population of 800.

References

Witobel